Pileru mandal is one of the 30 mandals in Annamayya district of the Indian state of Andhra Pradesh. It is under the administration of Rayachoti revenue division the headquarters are located at Pileru.The mandal is bounded by Sodam, Rompicherla, Pulicherla Mandals Of Chittoor District, Yerravaripalem mandal of Tirupati District and Kalikiri, KV Palle mandals Of Annamayya District. The mandal used to be a part of Chittoor district and was made part of the newly formed Annamayya District on 4 April 2022.

Towns and villages 
The settlements in the mandal are listed below:

References 

Mandals in Annamayya district